Wilberforce House is a British historic house museum, part of the Museums Quarter of Kingston-upon-Hull. It is the birthplace of social reformer William Wilberforce (1759–1833), who used his time as a member of Parliament to work for the abolition of slavery throughout the British Empire. Like the nearby Blaydes House and Maister House, also on the High Street, the Grade I listed building was formerly a merchant's house with access to quayside on the River Hull.

The house is now a museum showcasing the life and work of one of Hull's most famous sons. The museum re-opened on 25 March 2007, after a two-year £1.6 million redevelopment, in time for the 200th anniversary of Wilberforce's Act of Parliament abolishing the slave trade in the British Empire.

The front garden, named after Nelson Mandela, contains a statue of Wilberforce which underwent a £10,000 restoration in 2011. The statue was designated a Grade II* in 1994 and is now recorded in the National Heritage List for England, maintained by Historic England. Adjoining the site is Oriel Chambers, the home of the University of Hull's Wilberforce Institute for the Study of Slavery and Emancipation which conducts research into historic and contemporary forms of slavery.

The house also exhibits the East Yorkshire regimental collection.

References

External links

Official site

Museums in Kingston upon Hull
Historic houses in Kingston upon Hull
Biographical museums in the East Riding of Yorkshire
Grade I listed buildings in the East Riding of Yorkshire
Grade I listed houses
Historic house museums in the East Riding of Yorkshire
Slavery museums